James Tilley is a professor of politics at the University of Oxford and a fellow of Jesus College, Oxford. He is a specialist in the study of public opinion and electoral behaviour.

Selected works
 Geoff Evans and James Tilley (2017), The New Politics of Class: The political exclusion of the British working class (Oxford: Oxford University Press). 
 Sara Hobolt and James Tilley (2014), Blaming Europe? Responsibility without accountability in the European Union (Oxford: Oxford University Press).

Broadcasts 
 BBC Radio 4 (Analysis): What's the point of protest? 
 BBC Radio 4 (Analysis): Personality Politics
BBC Radio 4 (Analysis): Do Voters Need Therapy?
BBC Radio 4 (Analysis): Conspiracy Politics
BBC Radio 4: Let's Raise the Voting Age!
BBC World Service (The Inquiry): How do Dictators Survive so Long
BBC Radio 4 (Analysis): The Dictator's Survival Guide
BBC World Service (The Why Factor): What Can Chimps Teach us About Politics
BBC Radio 4 (Analysis): Primate Politics

References

Fellows of Jesus College, Oxford
Alumni of the University of Oxford
Living people
Year of birth missing (living people)
British political scientists